AB Bank Rwanda (ABR), is a microfinance bank in Rwanda. The bank is one of the licensed banks in the Republic of Rwanda.

Overview
ABR is a Rwandan microfinance bank, wholly owned by International institutions, that was established in 2013. It is affiliated with, and is subsidiary of AccessHolding, a commercial microfinance investment and holding company based in Germany, with subsidiaries in Azerbaijan, Madagascar, Tanzania, Nigeria, Liberia, Tajikistan, Zambia and Rwanda.

History
The bank was granted a banking license by the National Bank of Rwanda, the national banking regulator, in 2013 and commenced commercial banking services in the same year. By June 2014, AB Bank Rwanda maintained over 4,000 deposit accounts and more than 1,300 loan accounts. The loan book exceeded RWF:1 billion (US$1.5 million).

Ownership
The stock of the bank is privately owned by institutional investors. , the shareholding in the bank is as depicted in the table below:

Branch network
As of March 2019, the bank maintains six branches and six credit outlets across the country.

 Nyamirambo Branch - Nyamirambo, Kigali
 Nyarugenge Branch - Nyarugenge, Kigali - Main Branch
 Gisozi Branch - Gasabo, Kigali
 Kimironko Branch -Kimironko, Kigali
Nyabugogo Branch - Nyabugogo, Kigali
Musanze Branch - Musanze
Muhanga Credit Outlet - Muhanga
Rwamagana Credit Outlet - Rwamagana
Kabarondo Credit Outlet - Kabarondo
Huye Credit Outlet - Huye
Gicumbi Credit Outlet - Gicumbi
Nyagatare Credit Outlet - Nyagatare
Rubavu Credit Outlet - Rubavu
Rusizi Credit Outlet - Kamembe
Nyamata Credit Outlet - Bugesera
Nyanza Credit Outlet - Nyanza
Ruhango Credit Outlet - Ruhango

See also
 List of banks in Rwanda
 Economy of Rwanda

References

External links
  Website of AB Bank Rwanda
 Website of Rwanda National Bank

Banks of Rwanda
Banks established in 2013
2013 establishments in Rwanda
Organisations based in Kigali
Economy of Kigali